Ligota  is a village in the administrative district of Gmina Trzebnica, within Trzebnica County, Lower Silesian Voivodeship, in south-western Poland, which, prior to 1945, was in Germany.

References

Ligota